October 29 - Eastern Orthodox liturgical calendar - October 31

All fixed commemorations below are observed on November 12 by Eastern Orthodox Churches on the Old Calendar.

For October 30th, Orthodox Churches on the Old Calendar commemorate the Saints listed on October 17.

Saints
 Apostle Cleopas of the Seventy, brother of Righteous Joseph the Betrothed (1st century)
 Apostles Tertius (Terence), Mark, Justus, and Artemas, of the Seventy Disciples (1st century)
 Hieromartyr Marcian, Bishop of Syracuse (2nd century)  (see also: February 9)
 Virgin-martyr Apollonia of Alexandria the deaconess (parthénos presbytis), and those with her in Alexandria (249)  (see also: February 9)
 Martyrs Alexander, Cronion, Julian, Macarius, and 13 companions, at Alexandria (250)
 Martyr Eutropia of Alexandria (250)
 Hieromartyr Zenobius, Bishop of Aegae in Cilicia, and his sister Zenobia (285)
 Martyrs Claudius, Asterius, Neon and Neonilla, siblings, of Laranda in Cilicia, by beheading (c. 288)  (see also: October 29)
 Martyr Manuel (Emmanuel).
 Martyr Dometios of Phrygia, by the sword.  (see also: March 23)
 Martyr Demios, the former executioner.   (see also: March 25)
 Holy Nine Martyrs.
 Saint Asterius, Metropolitan of Amasea (before 431)
 Venerable Therapon, Ascetic and Wonderworker of Lythrodontas, Cyprus (c. 7th century)

Pre-Schism Western saints
 Saint Marcellus of Tangier, a Roman centurion in Tangier in North Africa (298)
 Saints Claudius, Lupercus and Victorius, three brothers, sons of the centurion St Marcellus of Tangier, martyred in Léon in Spain under Diocletian (c. 300)
 Saint Saturninus of Cagliari, a martyr in Cagliari in Sardinia under Diocletian, beheaded during a pagan festival of Jupiter (303)
 Saint Theonestus, by tradition Bishop of Philippi, later martyred in Altino in Italy (425)
 Martyrs of North-West Africa.
 Saint Arilda of Oldbury, virgin-martyr in Gloucestershire, England (c. 5th century){{#tag:ref|"[Leland's Itinerary, viii. p. 75.]"
 "S. Arilda is said to have been a maiden of Kington, near Thornbury, in Gloucestershire, who was murdered by one Muncius in defence of her purity. The date of her death cannot be fixed. The church of Oldbury in that county is dedicated in her name; her body was translated to the abbey of Gloucester. The name is Saxon, not British."|group=note}}
 Saint Eutropia, a holy woman who lived in Auvergne in France (5th century)
 Saint Lucanus, a martyr in Lagny in France, where his relics were enshrined (5th century)
 Saint Germanus of Capua, Bishop of Capua and a friend of St Benedict (c. 545)
 Saint Talarican, probably Pictish, St Talarican was a bishop in Scotland and several churches were dedicated to him (8th century)
 Saint Herbert (Haberne, Herbern), Abbot of Marmoutier and later Archbishop of Tours in France (916) 
 Saint Ethelnoth, called 'the Good' and famed for his wisdom, was a monk at Glastonbury, became thirty-second Archbishop of Canterbury (1038)
 Saint Nanterius (Nantier, Nantère), Abbot of Saint Mihiel Abbey in Lorraine in France (1044)

Post-Schism Orthodox saints
 Saint Joseph I Galesiotes, Patriarch of Constantinople (1283)Great Synaxaristes:  Ὁ Ἅγιος Ἰωσὴφ Πατριάρχης Κωνσταντινουπόλεως. 30 Οκτωβρίου. ΜΕΓΑΣ ΣΥΝΑΞΑΡΙΣΤΗΣ.
 Saint Stephen Milutin, King of Serbia (1320), his brother St. Dragutin (monk Theoctistus) (1316), and their mother St. Helen (1306)Great Synaxaristes:  Οἱ Ὅσιοι Στέφανος, Θεόκτιστος καὶ Ἑλένη. 30 Οκτωβρίου. ΜΕΓΑΣ ΣΥΝΑΞΑΡΙΣΤΗΣ. 12 ноября (30 октября). Православная Энциклопедия под редакцией Патриарха Московского и всея Руси Кирилла (электронная версия). (Orthodox Encyclopedia - Pravenc.ru).
 Martyr Jotham Zedginidze, near Lake Paravani, Georgia (1465)St Jotham Zedgenidze. OCA - Lives of the Saints.
 Saint St Eutropia (Isayenkova) of Kherson, Nun in Crimea, aged 105 years (1968)

New martyrs and confessors
 New Hieromartyr Nicanor (Kudriavtsev) bishop of Bogoroditsk (1923)
 New Hieromartyr Eugene (Zernov), Metropolitan of Gorkovsky (Nizhni Novgorod) (1935)
 New Hieromartyr Leonid Vinogradov, Priest (1941)
 New Hieromartyr Matthew Kazarin, Protodeacon of Alma Ata (1942) 30 октября по старому стилю  /  12 ноября по новому стилю. Русская Православная Церковь - Православный церковный календарь на 2015 год.
 New Hiero-confessor Varnava Nastić of Bosnia, Bishop of Hvosno (1964)

Other commemorations
 Finding of the relics of Great-martyr Stephen-Urosh III of Decani, Serbia (1338)
 Icon of the Mother of God of Ozeryanka (16th century)
 Uncovering of the relics of St. Agafangel (Preobrazhensky), Metropolitan of Yaroslavl, Confessor of the Faith (1998)
 Uncovering of the relics (2009) of St. Eutropia (Isayenkova) of Kherson (1968) В ХЕРСОНСКОЙ ЕПАРХИИ ОБРЕТЕНЫ МОЩИ МОНАХИНИ ЕВТРОПИИ (ИСАЕНКОВОЙ). Pravoslavie.ru. Херсон, 17 ноября 2009 г.
 Repose of Archimandrite Boris (Kholchev) of Tashkent (1971)

Icon gallery

Notes

References

Sources
 October 30/November 12. Orthodox Calendar (PRAVOSLAVIE.RU).
 November 12 / October 30. HOLY TRINITY RUSSIAN ORTHODOX CHURCH (A parish of the Patriarchate of Moscow).
 October 30. OCA - The Lives of the Saints.
 The Autonomous Orthodox Metropolia of Western Europe and the Americas (ROCOR). St. Hilarion Calendar of Saints for the year of our Lord 2004. St. Hilarion Press (Austin, TX). p. 81.
 The Thirtieth Day of the Month of October. Orthodoxy in China.
 October 30. Latin Saints of the Orthodox Patriarchate of Rome.
 The Roman Martyrology. Transl. by the Archbishop of Baltimore. Last Edition, According to the Copy Printed at Rome in 1914. Revised Edition, with the Imprimatur of His Eminence Cardinal Gibbons. Baltimore: John Murphy Company, 1916. p. 333-334.
 Rev. Richard Stanton. A Menology of England and Wales, or, Brief Memorials of the Ancient British and English Saints Arranged According to the Calendar, Together with the Martyrs of the 16th and 17th Centuries. London: Burns & Oates, 1892. pp. 518–519.
Greek Sources
 Great Synaxaristes:  30 ΟΚΤΩΒΡΙΟΥ. ΜΕΓΑΣ ΣΥΝΑΞΑΡΙΣΤΗΣ.
  Συναξαριστής. 30 Οκτωβρίου. ECCLESIA.GR. (H ΕΚΚΛΗΣΙΑ ΤΗΣ ΕΛΛΑΔΟΣ).
  30/10/2015.'' Ορθόδοξος Συναξαριστής. 
Russian Sources
  12 ноября (30 октября). Православная Энциклопедия под редакцией Патриарха Московского и всея Руси Кирилла (электронная версия). (Orthodox Encyclopedia - Pravenc.ru).
  30 октября по старому стилю  /  12 ноября по новому стилю. Русская Православная Церковь - Православный церковный календарь на 2015 год.

October in the Eastern Orthodox calendar